Rubys Corner is an unincorporated community located in the town of Porterfield, Marinette County, Wisconsin, United States.

Geography
It is connected by road to Walsh and Loomis to the west, Marinette to the southeast, and McAllister and Wausaukee to the north. Rubys Corner has a restaurant and a gas station with a convenience store.

Name
Rubys Corner is named after William Ruby (1868–1927) and his wife Olive Ruby, née Cole (1873–1964). The Rubys operated a fox farm at the corner.

References

External links

Unincorporated communities in Wisconsin
Unincorporated communities in Marinette County, Wisconsin